Basic sediment and water (BS&W) is a both a technical specification of certain impurities in crude oil and the method for measuring it.  When extracted from an oil reservoir, the crude oil will contain some amount of water and suspended solids from the reservoir formation.  The particulate matter is known as sediment or mud.  The water content can vary greatly from field to field, and may be present in large quantities for older fields, or if oil extraction is enhanced using water injection technology.  The bulk of the water and sediment is usually separated at the field to minimize the quantity that needs to be transported further.  The residual content of these unwanted impurities is measured as BS&W.  Oil refineries may either buy crude to a certain BS&W specification or may alternatively have initial crude oil dehydration and desalting process units that reduce the BS&W to acceptable limits, or a combination thereof.

Testing 
ASTM method D4007 or API Manual of Petroleum Measurement Standards chapter 10.4 are commonly used to measure BS&W. These methods both consist of mixing equal volumes of solvent and crude oil then centrifuging in order to separate any solids, free water, or suspended particles.

More precise methods beyond BS&W are available to independently measure water or solids present in 
a sample of crude oil.

References

Sources
 

Industrial processes
Chemical process engineering
Oil refining